The 1868 United States presidential election in Kentucky took place on November 3, 1868, as part of the 1868 United States presidential election. Voters chose 11 representatives, or electors to the Electoral College, who voted for president and vice president.

Kentucky voted for the Democratic nominee, Horatio Seymour over the Republican nominee, Ulysses S. Grant. Seymour won the state by a margin of 49.1%.

With 74.55% of the popular vote, Kentucky would be Seymour's strongest victory in terms of percentage in the popular vote. As of the 2020 presidential election, this remains the strongest-ever performance by a presidential nominee in the Bluegrass State who had a major-party opponent, as well as the last time that Clinton County or Cumberland County would vote for a Democratic presidential candidate.

Results

References

Kentucky
1868
1868 Kentucky elections